The Downtown Evanston Historic District in Evanston, Wyoming includes about sixty buildings in a compact downtown commercial district.

The bulk of the buildings in the district were built between 1880 and 1930 as the city grew in stature. Sustained by the railroads, coal  and mining, Evanston's central business district reflected the area's prosperity. A later oil boom brought further development.

Significant buildings include the city hall, the courthouse-post office, Downs' Opera House and the Strand cinema.

The Strand burned down in 2007. Its shell remains vacant, but it was being considered for restoration.

The district was placed on the National Register of Historic Places in 1983.

References

External links
 Downtown Evanston Historic District at the Wyoming State Historic Preservation Office

Geography of Uinta County, Wyoming
Historic districts on the National Register of Historic Places in Wyoming
National Register of Historic Places in Uinta County, Wyoming
Evanston, Wyoming